Velike Pčelice is a village in Pivara municipality in Kragujevac city district in the Šumadija District of central Serbia. It is located south of the city.

It has a population of 673.

External links
Satellite map at Maplandia.com

Populated places in Šumadija District
Kragujevac